The women's high jump event at the 2017 European Athletics Indoor Championships was held on 3 March at 17:30 (qualification) and 4 March at 16:30 (final) local time.

Medalists

Records

Results

Qualification
Qualification: Qualifying performance 1.93 (Q) or at least 8 best performers (q) advance to the Final.

Final

References

2017 European Athletics Indoor Championships
High jump at the European Athletics Indoor Championships